Daniel Goldhaber is an American  director, screenwriter, and  producer. In 2018, he directed CAM, a psychological horror film set in the world of webcam pornography. In 2022, he co-wrote, directed, and produced the thriller film How to Blow Up a Pipeline, based on the book of the same name by Andreas Malm.

Career

Goldhaber attended Harvard University where he completed the Visual and Environmental Studies film program. While still an undergraduate, he wrote, produced, and directed the 2013 short film Bad Kid, which was selected as a short film of the month by Cinephilia and Beyond. He also worked as an assistant editor on Chasing Ice, the Academy Award-nominated documentary about the Extreme Ice Survey.

Goldhaber's first feature was the 2018 horror film CAM, a Netflix original movie produced by Blumhouse Productions, starring Madeline Brewer. The Guardian called it "an excellent exploration of personas and projection online," and The New York Times said it "upend[ed] the typical thriller trope of the sex worker as helpless victim"

In 2022, he wrote, produced, and directed How to Blow Up a Pipeline, and adaptation of Andreas Malm's 2021 nonfiction Verso novel, also called How to Blow Up a Pipeline. The film had its festival premiere in the Platform Prize program at the 2022 Toronto International Film Festival and will be released theatrically by NEON in 2023. It stars Ariela Barer, Kristine Froseth, Lukas Gage, Forrest Goodluck, Sasha Lane, Jayme Lawson, Marcus Scribner, Jake Weary, and Irene Bedard.

Filmography

Film

Television

References

External links

Personal Website

Film directors from Colorado
People from Boulder, Colorado
21st-century American screenwriters
21st-century American male writers
American male screenwriters
American film producers
Living people

Year of birth missing (living people)
Harvard College alumni